Kizhakkumbhagom  is a village  Located Koovappady City  in Ernakulam district in the Indian state of Kerala.

Demographics
 India census, Kizhakkumbhagom had a population of 10038 with 4940 males and 5098 females.

References

Villages in Ernakulam district